Mohamed Ayoub Ferjani (born July 27, 1986) is a male foil fencer from Tunisia, African champion in 2013 and 2015. He is the elder brother of sabre fencer Fares Ferjani.

Ferjani almost never takes part in Fencing World Cup competitions, but participates in continental championships in both foil and épée. His first significant result was a double bronze medal in épée and foil at the 2007 All-Africa Games in Algiers. He stopped fencing épée in international competitions in 2012. He qualified to represent his country in men's foil at the 2016 Summer Olympics. He will compete in Rio de Janeiro with his brother Fares, who qualified in men's sabre.

Ferjani teaches fencing in Trappes and Montigny-le-Bretonneux, in the vicinity of Paris. He is also an international referee for foil and was named the second best referee in this weapon in 2012, 2013 and 2014.

References

1986 births
Living people
Tunisian male épée fencers
Olympic fencers of Tunisia
Fencers at the 2016 Summer Olympics
African Games bronze medalists for Tunisia
African Games medalists in fencing
Competitors at the 2007 All-Africa Games
Competitors at the 2015 African Games
Competitors at the 2019 African Games
Tunisian male foil fencers
21st-century Tunisian people